The Camera Obscura is a large-scale camera obscura, in the Lands End area of the Outer Richmond District in western San Francisco, California.

It is located immediately adjacent to the Cliff House, perched on the headlands on the cliffs just north of Ocean Beach. Both the Camera and the Cliff House are owned by the National Park Service and are within the Golden Gate National Recreation Area. The Camera Obscura was added to the National Register of Historic Places in 2001 and is within the NPS Sutro Historic District. It is within the Golden Gate National Recreation Area, since being acquired by the National Park Service in 1977.

History
Cameras obscura, devices which project an image of the surroundings onto a surface using only existing exterior light sources, usually sunlight, have a long history in San Francisco.  The first recorded reference to one in the city is from the 1860s in an attraction called Woodward's Gardens.  A previous incarnation of the Cliff House was noted to have had a camera obscura on its fourth floor in 1896.  This camera obscura was destroyed when the restaurant burned down in 1907.

When the third Cliff House opened in 1937, the owner was approached by businessman Floyd Jennings with the idea of adding a camera obscura to the cliffs beside the restaurant.  It was installed on the site in 1946 and has been in continuous operation since then.

Technology
The San Francisco Camera Obscura projects an image onto a horizontal viewing table via a reflected image from a viewpoint at the top of the building.  A metal hood in the cupola at the top of the building slowly rotates, making a full revolution in about six minutes, allowing for a 360° view around the building.

Light enters the building via an angled mirror in the metal hood.  It then passed through a lens with a 150 in. (381 cm) focal length and is projected onto a parabolic white "table" in a black room.  The origin of the lens is uncertain but it appears to have been part of a telescope, likely manufactured by the Clark Lens Company of Cambridge, Massachusetts.

Preservation
The Camera Obscura was added to the National Register of Historic Places in 2001 for its engineering significance.  While the exterior of the building was extensively modified in 1957 to appear as a giant camera, the internal workings of the camera obscura, the basis of its placement on the Register, have remained unchanged since its erection in 1946.  The 1957 external architecture was eligible to be evaluated for historical significance upon reaching fifty years of age in 2007.

See also
National Register of Historic Places listings in San Francisco, California
Sutro Historic District

References

External links
  
 

San Francisco
Golden Gate National Recreation Area
Buildings and structures in San Francisco
Buildings and structures on the National Register of Historic Places in California
National Register of Historic Places in San Francisco
Richmond District, San Francisco
Tourist attractions in San Francisco